San Jose  is a village in Logan and Mason counties, Illinois, United States, founded in 1858. The population was 479 at the 2020 census, down from 642 in 2010.

History 
San Jose was platted in 1858. The village was incorporated in 1876.

Geography
San Jose is located in eastern Mason County and northwestern Logan County. U.S. Route 136 passes through the village as its Main Street, leading west  to Havana, the Mason county seat, and east  to McLean.

Demographics 

As of the census of 2000, there were 696 people, 261 households, and 199 families residing in the village. The racial makeup of the village was 99.28% White, 0.29% African American and 0.43% Native American. Hispanic or Latino of any race were 0.72% of the population.

There were 261 households, out of which 37.5% had children under the age of 18 living with them, 59.8% were married couples living together, 11.9% had a female householder with no husband present, and 23.4% were non-families. 19.5% of all households were made up of individuals, and 12.6% had someone living alone who was 65 years of age or older. The average household size was 2.67 and the average family size was 3.05.

In the village, the population was spread out, with 27.0% under the age of 18, 7.9% from 18 to 24, 29.3% from 25 to 44, 19.8% from 45 to 64, and 15.9% who were 65 years of age or older. The median age was 37 years. For every 100 females, there were 89.1 males. For every 100 females age 18 and over, there were 94.6 males.

The median income for a household in the village was $39,028, and the median income for a family was $45,104. Males had a median income of $37,083 versus $22,500 for females.  The per capita income for the village was $18,110. About 2.7% of families and 2.9% of the population were below the poverty line, including 1.9% of those under age 18 and none of those age 65 or over.

References

External links 

 

Populated places established in 1858
Villages in Logan County, Illinois
Villages in Mason County, Illinois
Villages in Illinois
1858 establishments in Illinois